Ron Spencer is an American illustrator whose most famous work has been for the collectible card game Magic: The Gathering.

Early life 
Ron Spencer grew up on a farm in Aurora, Nebraska. As a child, his reading material included such Marvel Comics as Conan the Barbarian.

Artwork 
Spencer is primarily self-taught though he did attend a two-year college in Idaho. He uses various elements of mixed media, including colored pencils, ballpoint pens, watercolors, and acrylic paint. His trademark on a vast majority of his earlier trading cards is a hidden name somewhere in the artwork. For example, the name DALE can be clearly seen in the Alliance expansion card Misfortune. He lists his inspirations as Richard Corben and Swamp Thing illustrator Bernie Wrightson.

He has also created artwork for several books of the World of Darkness series from White Wolf, Inc, as well as the Talislanta line of role-playing games.

Ron Spencer lives in Aurora, Nebraska. He has six children with his late wife Stacie who died in 2009. He is also brother to fellow artist Terese Nielsen.

Plush Toys
Ron Spencer has also actively worked with Toy Vault, Inc. in creating plush toys and slippers, with various designs under their horror and fantasy brands such as Cthulhu, "Here Be Monsters", and dragons.  Among these designs is the rare Necronomicon plush book.

Altered Cards
Ron Spencer releases periodically altered Magic cards also commonly known as Extreme Alteration. The cards are painted over with different artwork incorporating the original picture. Other Magic: The Gathering artists such as Terese Nielsen and Mark Poole also provide this service for their fans.

Bibliography

Magic: The Gathering Sets 
Some cards listed are reprinted from set to set.
 Alpha (1993) - 1 card
 Beta (1993) - 1 card
 Unlimited (1993) - 1 card
 Revised (1994) - 1 card
 The Dark (1994) - 10 cards
 Fallen Empires - (1994) - 8 cards
 4th Edition (1995) - 4 cards
 Ice Age (1995) - 5 cards
 Alliances (1996) - 2 cards
 Mirage (1996) - 7 cards
 Visions (1997) - 3 cards
 Fifth Edition (1997) - 10 cards
 Weatherlight (1997) - 6 cards
 Tempest (1997) - 10 cards
 Stronghold (1998) - 9 cards
 Exodus (1998) - 7 cards
 Urza's Saga (1998) - 17 cards
 Urza's Legacy (1999) - 5 cards
 Urza's Destiny (1999) - 3 cards
 Classic (Sixth Edition) (1999) - 4 cards
 Mercadian Masques (1999) - 5 cards
 Nemesis (2000) - 3 cards
 Prophecy (2000) - 3 cards
 Invasion (2000) - 9 cards
 Seventh Edition (2001) - 7 cards
 Planeshift (2001) - 3 cards
 Apocalypse (2001) - 5 cards
 Odyssey (2001) - 9 cards
 Torment (2002) - 2 cards
 Judgment (2002) - 3 cards
 Onslaught (2002) - 10 cards
 Legions (2003) - 3 cards
 Scourge (2003) - 4 cards
 Eighth Edition (2003) - 8 cards
 Ninth Edition (2005) - 3 cards
 Tenth Edition (2007) - 5 cards
 Magic 2010 (2009) - 1 card
 Magic 2011 (2010) - 1 card

Dungeons & Dragons 
 Ghostwalk (2003)
 Draconomicon (2003)
 Complete Warrior (2003)
 Book of Exalted Deeds (2003)
 Unearthed Arcana (2004)
 Races of Stone (2004)
 Complete Divine (2004)
 Complete Arcane (2004)
 Sandstorm (2005)
 Lords of Madness (2005)
 Complete Adventurer (2005)
 Player's Handbook II (2006)

Hearthstone 
Master of Disguise (Classic Set)

References

Notes 
1.Includes 2 versions of Swamp.

External links

An Interview With Ron Spencer

Magic: the Gathering - Cards illustrated by Ron Spencer
Plush Toys

American illustrators
Ballpoint pen art
Fantasy artists
Game artists
Living people
People from Aurora, Nebraska
Role-playing game artists
Year of birth missing (living people)